Tomas del Rosario College is a private college in the Philippines.
It was formerly known as Tomas del Rosario Academy. It became a college in 1994. Students from this school are called "del Rosarians".

Tomas del Rosario College is the only PACU-COA level II accredited private school in Bataan. It currently offers courses in the field of nursing, accounting, management, marketing, banking, education, and computer science.

Location
The college is located along Capitol Drive in Barangay San Jose, Balanga, Bataan.

Courses offered
Basic Education Department
K to 12

College Department
Bachelor of Science in Accountancy 
Bachelor of Science in Business Administration major in Marketing Management
Bachelor of Science in Business Administration major in Operations Management
Bachelor in Elementary Education major in General Education 
Bachelor in Elementary Education major in Pre-Elementary Education
Bachelor of Science in Computer Science 
Bachelor of Science in Nursing
Bachelor of Science in Hotel and Restaurant Management

Graduate School (Trimestral Calendar)
Master of Arts in Education major in Educational Management

Teaching methods

College Department:

Junior High School: Philippine Science Classes Curriculum oriented

For Regular Students, EC (Enhanced Curriculum) is offered.  An extra subject is Added per grade level.
Grade 7 (Extra subject) -  Environmental science
Grade 8 (Extra subject) -  Speech (Oral Communication)
Grade 9 (Extra subject) -  Journalism (Creative Writing)
Grade 10 (Extra subject) -  Calculus for High School

Senior High School: Academic track/s
Science, technology, engineering, and mathematics
Accountancy, Business, and Management
Humanities and Social Sciences

Elementary and Pre-School: The Teaching Pedagogy implemented in this school for both levels starting S.Y. 2012-2013 comprises a reformed Montessorian method of education, with the principle that we uphold the holistic development and freedom of the student to explore his or her strengths.

Notable alumni

Romi Garduce, Mountaineer, TV Personality/Host
 Darwin Saribay - 3rd Place in the CPA Board Examination — May 2011
 Teri Onor- Politician / TV Personality 
 Joseph De Leon Yumul- Gold medalist in the Philippine National Skills competition — March 2012, Philippine representative in the 9th ASEAN Skills Competition

Buildings, facilities and landmarks
 Don Tomas del Rosario Landmark
 KKK (Kamalig Kalinangang Kabataan)
 Munting Gubat
 Speech Laboratory
 Computer labs
 BSN lab

References

 
 
 

Universities and colleges in Bataan
Education in Balanga, Bataan
High schools in Bataan